is a Japanese light novel series written by Miraijin A. The series originated on the Shōsetsuka ni Narō website, before being published in print with illustrations by Jimmy by Kodansha beginning in July 2020. As of December 2022, four volumes have been released. A manga adaptation, illustrated by Natsumi Inoue, began serialization on the Magazine Pocket website in June 2020. As of November 2022, the manga's individual chapters have been collected into nine volumes.

Plot
A Japanese salaryman dies and reincarnates in another world as Ars Louvent, heir of a noble family and discovers that he also possesses the skill to appraise the talents and aptitudes of other people. With his special powers, Ars identifies and convinces powerful individuals who excel in various subjects, from magic and swordsmanship to strategy and diplomacy to become his servants and allies in preparation for an imminent war for the throne's succession.

Media

Light novel
Written by Miraijin A, the light novel began publication on the novel posting website Shōsetsuka ni Narō on October 31, 2019. The series was later acquired by Kodansha, who published the series with illustrations by Jimmy under their Kodansha Ranobe Books imprint beginning on July 2, 2020. As of December 2022, four volumes have been released.

In March 2022, Kodansha USA announced that they also licensed the light novel series for English publication.

Volume list

Manga
A manga adaptation, illustrated by Natsumi Inoue, began serialization in Magazine Pocket on June 26, 2020. As of November 2022, the series' individual chapters have been collected into nine tankōbon volumes.

In November 2021, Kodansha USA announced that they licensed the manga for English publication, with the first volume being released in September 2022.

Volume list

Reception
The web novel has over 30 million views. 

In the 2021 Next Manga Award, the manga won the U-Next Prize and ranked 18th in the web manga category.

Notes

References

External links
 

2020 Japanese novels
Anime and manga based on light novels
Fiction about reincarnation
Isekai anime and manga
Isekai novels and light novels
Japanese webcomics
Kodansha books
Kodansha manga
Light novels
Light novels first published online
Shōnen manga
Shōsetsuka ni Narō
Vertical (publisher) titles
Webcomics in print